The Howard Van Vleck Arboretum is a  arboretum located on the grounds of the Montclair Art Museum, 3 South Mountain Avenue, Montclair, in Essex County, New Jersey, United States. The arboretum is open daily without charge.

The arboretum first began in 1940 as museum landscaping by horticulturist Howard Van Vleck, and has been named in his honor. It was redesigned and partially replanted circa 2001 during the museum's expansion.

See also 
 List of botanical gardens in the United States
 Van Vleck House and Gardens

External links 
 Montclair Art Museum
Arboretum landscape project

Arboreta in New Jersey
Botanical gardens in New Jersey
Protected areas of Essex County, New Jersey
Montclair, New Jersey